Oliver Buchanan Munroe (1856–1916) was an American politician who served as the seventh mayor of Melrose, Massachusetts.

References

1856 births
1916 deaths
Brown University alumni
Mayors of Melrose, Massachusetts
Politicians from Providence, Rhode Island